Ardillières is a commune in the Charente-Maritime department in the Nouvelle-Aquitaine region of southwestern France.

The inhabitants of the commune are known as Ardilliérois or Ardilliéroises

Geography
Ardillières is located some 25 km south-east of La Rochelle and 20 km east of Châtelaillon-Plage. Access to the commune is by the D111 road from Ciré-d'Aunis in the west passing through the commune and the village and continuing to the east. The D208 road also goes north-east from the village to join the D939 at Le Cher. The D205E2 also goes north-west from the village to Le Thou. Apart from the village there are also the hamlets of Les Perrieres, Toucherit, Villeneuve, and Bois des Mottes. The commune is entirely farmland apart from a few small patches of forest.

The southern portion of the commune is covered with a network of canals which link to the Charras Canal which crosses the south of the commune from west to east.

Neighbouring communes and villages

Administration

List of Successive Mayors

Demography
In 2017 the commune had 849 inhabitants.

Distribution of Age Groups
The population of the town is younger than the departmental average.

Percentage Distribution of Age Groups in Ardillières and Charente-Maritime Department in 2017

Source: INSEE

Culture and heritage

Civil heritage
The commune has several sites and buildings that are registered as historical monuments:
The Château d'Ardillières (14th century). There are two round towers. The 17th century lodging is surrounded by farm buildings of the same period and recent constructions. The medieval cellar is remarkable.
The Pierre Levée Dolmen (Neolithic)
The Pierre-Fouquerée Dolmen (Neolithic)

Other sites of interest
The Charras Canal
A Mill (Charles Goumard built it in the early 16th century). It contains a Lintel (1508) which is registered as an historical object.
A Wind Farm
Rural cottages

Religious heritage
The Parish Church of Saint Peter (11th century) is registered as an historical monument. The Church has a Bronze Bell (1635) which is registered as an historical object.

Ardillières Picture Gallery

Notable people linked to the commune
Pierre Le Moyne d'Iberville, Squire of Iberville and Ardillières, founder of the Louisiana colony in 1700 where he built the Fort of Biloxi.

See also
Communes of the Charente-Maritime department

References

External links
Ardillières on the National Geographic Institute website 
Ardillières on Géoportail, National Geographic Institute (IGN) website 
Ardillières on the 1750 Cassini Map

Communes of Charente-Maritime